The Kentucky Fried Chicken murders were an armed robbery and mass murder which took place at a Kentucky Fried Chicken restaurant in Kilgore, Texas, in 1983. For over two decades, it was unsolved.

Robbery and murders
On the evening of September 23, 1983, just before the restaurant closed, armed robbers held up the Kentucky Fried Chicken restaurant in Kilgore, Texas, USA.  The five people in the restaurant at the time (who were either employees or waiting for someone there) were abducted, taken to a nearby field on County Road 232, and each executed with a shot to the back of the head. One of the victims, who was found a short distance from the others, had been raped.

The victims' bodies were discovered by local police and Texas Rangers, and were identified as: David Maxwell (20), Joey Johnson (20), Monty Landers (19), Mary Tyler (37) and Opie Hughes (39).

Investigation
For 22 years, the case remained unsolved, although several people were arrested. The discovery of a torn fingernail on one of the bodies lead to the arrest and charging of James Earl Mankins, Jr., a man with prior drug convictions who was also the son of state representative Jimmy Mankins. However, DNA analysis concluded that the fingernail was not his, and he was released after the beginning of pre-trial proceedings.

In November 2005, two men (already in prison for other crimes) were arrested and charged: cousins Darnell Hartsfield (44) and Romeo Pinkerton (47). At the time of arrest, Hartsfield was serving a life sentence for aggravated perjury in connection with the case. They were both charged with capital murder, and could have received the death penalty if convicted.

Convictions
Jury selection in Pinkerton's trial began August 6, 2007 in New Boston and completed on September 27, 2007. Pinkerton's death penalty trial was scheduled to start at 9 a.m. on October 15, 2007 at the Bowie County Courthouse in New Boston. An April 2007 article from the Houston Chronicle details Pinkerton's denial of the crime. Despite this, on October 29, 2007, Romeo Pinkerton pleaded guilty to five lesser counts of murder and was sentenced to five concurrent life sentences as a part of a plea deal.

In 2008, Hartsfield was convicted at trial in Bryan (Brazos County), Texas (on a change of venue from East Texas due to pre-trial publicity) and sentenced to five consecutive life sentences. On February 4, 2010, the Texas Sixth Court of Appeals upheld Hartsfield's conviction.

Possible third perpetrator
DNA evidence taken from Opie Hughes' body – found some distance away from the rest of the victims – indicated she had been sexually assaulted. However, the DNA did not match that of Hartsfield, Pinkerton, Mankins, or any other suspect. This led investigators to the possibility of a third man. Neither of the two convicted felons ever revealed the identity of any accomplice.

The murders were featured in the "Friday Night Ghosts" episode of Cold Case Files, which aired in February 2022.

References

1983 murders in the United States
Mass murder in 1983
Mass shootings in Texas
Murder in Texas
KFC
1983 in Texas
Crimes in Texas
Attacks on restaurants in North America
Deaths by firearm in Texas
September 1983 crimes
September 1983 events in the United States
Mass shootings in the United States
Massacres in 1983
Massacres in the United States